Snjoheinuten is a mountain in the municipality of Bykle in Agder county, Norway. The mountain sits on the southern shore of the lake Vatndalsvatnet, just west of the mountain Kvervetjønnuten and east of the lakes Reinevatn and Store Urevatn.

See also
List of mountains of Norway

References

Bykle
Mountains of Agder